Burning Daylight: The Adventures of 'Burning Daylight' in Civilization is a 1914 American adventure film directed by Hobart Bosworth, starring Hobart Bosworth and Myrtle Stedman. It is based on the 1910 novel Burning Daylight by Jack London. The film was released in October 1914, by Paramount Pictures.

Plot

Cast 
Hobart Bosworth as Elam Harnish
Myrtle Stedman as Dede Mason

References

External links 
 

1914 films
American adventure drama films
1910s adventure drama films
Films based on works by Jack London
Paramount Pictures films
American black-and-white films
American silent feature films
1914 drama films
1910s English-language films
1910s American films
Silent American drama films
Silent adventure drama films